A Swinging Introduction to Jimmy Knepper is an album led by trombonist Jimmy Knepper which was recorded in 1957 and originally released on the Bethlehem label. The album was rereleased in 1977 as Idol of the Flies.

Reception 

The Allmusic review by Scott Yanow states "The music is essentially cool-toned bop with six standards and three Knepper originals all being given swinging treatment".

Track listing 
All compositions by Jimmy Knepper except where noted.

 "Love Letters" (Victor Young, Edward Heyman) – 5:05
 "Ogling Ogre" – 3:42
 "You Stepped Out of a Dream" (Nacio Herb Brown, Gus Kahn) – 4:41
 "How High the Moon" (Morgan Lewis, Nancy Hamilton) – 3:58
 "Gee, Baby, Ain't I Good to You" (Andy Razaf, Don Redman) – 4:38
 "Idol of the Flies" – 5:46
 "Close as Pages in a Book" (Sigmund Romberg, Dorothy Fields) – 4:22
 "Avid Admirer" – 4:59
 "Irresistible You" (Don Raye, Gene de Paul) – 4:05

Personnel 
Jimmy Knepper – trombone
Gene Roland – trumpet, vocals (tracks 5, 7 & 9)
Gene Quill – alto saxophone (tracks 1–4, 6 & 8)
Bill Evans (tracks 1–4, 6 & 8), Bob Hammer (tracks 5, 7 & 9) – piano
Teddy Kotick – bass
Dannie Richmond – drums

References 

Jimmy Knepper albums
1957 albums
Bethlehem Records albums